Si Kefa (Hso Khan Hpa; , Tho Chi Bwa) was the ruler of the Kingdom of Mong Mao from 1340 to 1371. He sacked the Burmese kingdoms of Sagaing and Pinya in 1364.

Brief
According to the Burmese chronicles, his name was Tho Chi Bwa, younger brother of Tho Han Bwa, lord of Maw (Mong Mao), and son of Tho Khin Bwa, lord of Maw. Different transliterations of his name in the local Tai language include Sa Khaan Pha, Soe Khan Fa, Chau-ki-pha, Tai-Pong, and HsoKip-Hpa.

Si Kefa engaged in repeated raiding on neighboring chieftainships and in 1348–49 the Yuan court sent an expedition under Marshall Dashibadu to put an end to it. The expedition failed to subdue him, but Si did send his son Mansan to the Yuan court to offer allegiance. The Baiyi Zhuan reports that while Mansan "accepted the Court's calendar and offered tribute, his clothing, paraphernalia and system remained like those of a king." Both the Mong Mao and Hsenwi chronicles provide  lists of the far-flung domains he is said to have controlled reaching to the border of the Kingdom of Dali in the north, Xishuangbanna to the south, Central Myanmar to the southwest, and Yongchang to the west.

In the Burmese chronicles, he is remembered as the leader of the Maw forces that sacked the kingdoms of Sagaing and Pinya in 1364. He brought back King Narathu of Pinya and the loot to the Maw country. In the wake of the attacks, a Sagaing prince named Thado Minbya founded the Ava Kingdom in 1365.

Si Kefa has a privileged position in Mong Mao chronicle history as defining "an age when the Tay [Tai] lived in an expansive independent kingdom ruled by their own kings and use it as a point of departure for their accounts of post-fifteenth century history"

Notes

References

Bibliography
 Daniels, Christian (2006) "Historical memories of a Chinese adventurer in a Tay chronicle; Usurpation of the throne of a Tay polity in Yunnan, 1573-1584,"  International Journal of Asian Studies, 3, 1 (2006), pp. 21–48.
 Elias, N. (1876) Introductory Sketch of the History of the Shans in Upper Burma and Western Yunnan. Calcutta: Foreign Department Press. (Recent facsimile Reprint by Thai government in Chiang Mai University library).
 
 
 
 Liew, Foon Ming. (1996) "The Luchuan-Pingmian Campaigns (1436-1449): In the Light of Official Chinese Historiography". Oriens Extremus 39/2, pp. 162–203.
 
 Wade, Geoff (1996) "The Bai Yi Zhuan: A Chinese Account of Tai Society in the 14th Century," 14th Conference of the International Association of Historians of Asia (IAHA), Chulalongkorn University, Bangkok, Thailand [Includes a complete translation and introduction to the Ming travelogue "Bai-yi Zhuan", a copy can be found at the Thailand Information Center at Chulalongkorn Central Library]

14th-century Tai people
13th-century Tai people